Federal Route 207 is a federal road in Kelantan, Malaysia. The road connects Pasir Mas in the west to Wakaf Che Yeh in the east.

Features

At most sections, the Federal Route 207 was built under the JKR R5 road standard, with a speed limit of 90 km/h.

List of junctions and towns

References

Malaysian Federal Roads